PCPB may refer to:

 Carboxypeptidase B2
 Pentachlorophenol monooxygenase